The Darvish Detonates Paris is a 1976 Azerbaijani comedy film directed by Shamil Mahmudbeyov and Kamil Rustambeyov. It stars Adil Isgandarov as Hatamkhan agha, Sergei Yursky as Monsieur Jordan, and Mirza Babayev as Darvish Mastali Shah. The film was based on the satirical comedy A Story about the Botanist-doctor Monsieur Jordan and the Famous Sorcerer Dervish Mastali Shah, inspired from true events, by Azerbaijani playwright and poet Mirza Fatali Akhundov. The film criticizes the ignorance and backwardness in 19th century Azerbaijan. The character Monsieur Jordan is based on the accomplished French botanist Alexis Jordan. 

The Darvish Detonates Paris is often viewed as one of the most memorable films of Azerbaijani cinema. It holds an important place in the cultural heritage of Azerbaijan.

Plot 
The events take place in the mid-19th century Karabakh. Famous French botanist Monsieur Jordan visits Karabakh to investigate a number of plant species. After his arrival, he is suggested to visit and stay at the mansion of the wealthy landlord Hatamkhan agha. Although the nephew of Hatamkhan, Shahbaz, was planned to marry the daughter of Hatamkhan, Sharafnisa, after multiple conversations with the family and locals, Monsieur Jordan wants to take Shahbaz with him to Paris for a few years and educate him there. Seeing this, Sharafnisa and her mother Shahrabanu hire a sorcerer called Darvish Mastali shah. Darvhish puts on a show for the women, creating with wood a simple miniature town which he claims to be Paris and burning it down, while his assistant Gulamali delivers Jordan a fake letter from the authorities saying that Paris has burned down. Afterwards, Monsieur Jordan heads back to Paris but does not take Shahbaz with him because of the urgency of his return.

Cast 

Sergei Yursky as Monsieur Jordan
Adil Isgandarov as Hatamkhan agha
Mirza Babayev as Darvish Mastali shah
Leyla Badirbeyli as Shahrabanu
 Anvar Hasanov as Shahbaz
 Momunat Gurbanova as Sharafnisa
Hasanagha Turabov as Rashid
 Fazil Salayev as Gulamali
 Kamil Maharramov as Gambar
 Safura Ibrahimova as Sanam

See also 

 Cinema of Azerbaijan
 Azerbaijanfilm

References

External links 

 The Darvish Detonates Paris on Youtube
 A Story about the Botanist-doctor Monsieur Jordan and the Famous Sorcerer Dervish Mastali Shah in Azerbaijani at Wikisource

1976 films
Azerbaijani comedy films
Azerbaijani-language films